Noel Trevor Day (born 31 December 1953 in Johannesburg, Transvaal) is a South African former first class cricketer. He served as a wicketkeeper for Northern Transvaal cricket team and Transvaal cricket team for over a decade and took over 340 first class dismissals and 116 One Day dismissals as well as 5081 runs in first-class at an average of 30.42 and 1590 runs at an average of 24.46 in List A.

References

External links
Cricinfo

1953 births
Living people
South African cricketers
Gauteng cricketers
Wicket-keepers